John Stanton (born 28 October 1944) is an Australian actor.

Stanton has appeared in many stage, television and film productions throughout his extensive fifty-year career.

Early life
Stanton was born in Brisbane, Queensland. He attended Banyo State High School for his secondary education where he was a runner and swimmer. He is the brother of ecologist Peter Stanton.

Despite his obvious sporting talents, Stanton was more interested in pursuing acting as a career although he also had a desire to become a veterinarian. 

Stanton worked various jobs including as a school teacher and as a prawner on Moreton Bay.

At the age of 24, he unsuccessfully auditioned for the National Institute of Dramatic Art.

Stage 
Stanton moved to Melbourne to further his career.

He played the major supporting role of Peter Handcock (to Terence Donovan's leading role of Breaker Morant) in the first public performance of Kenneth G. Ross's play Breaker Morant: A Play in Two Acts, presented by the Melbourne Theatre Company at the Athenaeum Theatre, in Melbourne on 2 February 1978. He also played many other roles on stage including the lead in Shakespeare's Macbeth.

In 1979, Stanton appeared in the Melbourne Theatre Company production of the Harold Pinter play Betrayal which was the first time the production had been staged outside the United Kingdom.

In 2013, Stanton appeared as Willy Loman in the Black Swan Theatre Company production of Death of a Salesman.

Television 
Stanton's early television work included a stint in the soap opera Bellbird in 1972, and various guest-starring roles in the Crawford Productions police dramas Homicide, Division 4, Matlock Police. He also acted in the miniseries Against the Wind.

Despite having made six earlier appearances as different characters in Homicide, Stanton was cast as a regular character, lead detective Pat Kelly, in 1973–1974. In his final episode, Pat Kelly engaged in a romance with a woman played by his real-life wife Jill Forster, with whom he previously appeared in an episode of Matlock Police.

After leaving Homicide, Stanton continued to make guest appearances in TV dramas, and was later signed to replace the departing Gerard Kennedy in Division 4 – however, the series was summarily cancelled upon Kennedy's leaving, and Stanton's character of Sen. Det. Tom Morgan appeared in the final episode only.

He then played the regular lead role of Nick Manning in the later years of soap opera The Box. Jill Forster at that time also played the regular role of prim secretary Enid Parker in The Box, and in the storyline Enid eventually had a one-night stand with Stanton's character. When Stanton and Forster became expectant parents in real life and Forster left The Box to have the baby, likewise Enid fell pregnant and left to have the baby, and in the story Nick was the father. When Forster returned for the show's final episode in 1977 Enid's baby was played by Stanton and Forster's real-life child.

In 1981 he played the title character of Detective Sergeant Steve Bellamy in the police series Bellamy.

He was acclaimed in his role as Malcolm Fraser in television mini-series The Dismissal, for which he was awarded a Logie Award for Best Actor in a single drama or mini-series. When Stanton was cast in The Dismissal, the producers wanted him to wear a wig and prosthetics which Stanton refused.  In a 2013 interview, Stanton said: "I said 'there's no way I'm going to do that. Either I will create my own reality or I'm not going to be there at all' so I was one of the few that went without make-up." During the interview, Stanton also revealed what Fraser had said about the mini-series, recalling that he had said: "Well they got someone decent to play me - they should have got someone decent to play Whitlam", referring to the performance of Max Phipps.

During the early 1990s Stanton portrayed the character of Oliver Blackwood in the TV series The Man from Snowy River, and appeared in a recurring role as Bryce Redstaff in McLeod's Daughters from 2003–2007.

Stanton appeared in eight episodes of The Doctor Blake Mysteries as retired, then acting, Superintendent Douglas Ashby, from Season 1 to Season 3. 

In 1997, he appeared in an episode of Blue Heelers playing the character of Dougall Frazer.

Stanton was an announcer for Australia Day Live Concert in Sydney from 2018 to 2022.

Films
In addition to his stage and television work, Stanton has appeared in numerous movies with numerous film credits to his name.

In 1981, he appeared with Henri Szeps and Simone Buchanan in Run Rebecca, Run.

He starred as the bagman in the 1982 comedy film Kitty and the Bagman.

In 1983, Stanton appeared in the movie Dusty with Bill Kerr.

Stanton starred in the Daryl Duke-directed 1986 adventure drama film Tai-Pan and in the 1987 Australian film Great Expectations: The Untold Story.

Stanton also appeared in Rent-a-Cop, which starred Burt Reynolds and Liza Minnelli; the film received mostly negative reviews.

Voiceover roles
Stanton is known for his distinctive deep and rich voice, which has led to voiceover work.

This included being the English language announcer for the Sydney 2000 Olympic Opening Ceremony. He was also the voice on one or more television ads for the Opening Ceremony Official Album. He has also been the voice-over announcer for numerous television and radio ads, including Forty Winks bedding. He is also doing voice overs for Designer Direct.

He voiced of The Brolga in the animated TV series The Silver Brumby.

He is the narrator for the 8-part TV series Australians at War, which commenced Anzac Day, 25 April 2001.

He was also the narrator of the Australian commercial Grim Reaper.

He has also narrated "Hitler: The Final Chapter" released in 1992 by "Cyril Jones & Associates" and released in the U.S. in 1995.

He currently is an announcer for Seven News since 2020.

References

1944 births
Living people
Australian male film actors
Australian male stage actors
Australian male television actors
Australian male voice actors
Logie Award winners
Male actors from Brisbane
20th-century Australian male actors